Thylactus simulans is a species of beetle in the family Cerambycidae. It was described by Charles Joseph Gahan in 1890. It is known from Myanmar, India, Vietnam, and Thailand.

References

Xylorhizini
Beetles described in 1890